The following is a list of National Collegiate Athletic Association (NCAA) Division I college ice hockey teams that have qualified for the NCAA Division I men's ice hockey championship as of 2022 with teams listed by number of appearances.

Schools in Italics no longer compete in Division I.

† Appearance vacated by the NCAA.

‡ St. Lawrence received an automatic bid to the 2021 tournament but withdrew before seeding.

Teams without a tournament appearance

The following active Division I programs have never qualified for the NCAA tournament.

† Army played in Division II from 1973 through 1980 but was in the top division prior to 1973.

References

Appearances By Team